UltraDefrag is a disk defragmentation utility for Microsoft Windows. Prior to version 8.0.0 it was released under the GNU General Public License. The only other Windows-based defragmentation utility licensed under the GNU GPL was JkDefrag, discontinued in 2008.

In 2018, UltraDefrag sources have been relicensed to Green Gate Systems. Their enhanced 8.0.0 version, released under a proprietary license, features automatic defragmentation and is said to have much faster disk processing algorithms.

UltraDefrag uses the defragmentation part of Windows API and works on Windows NT 4.0 and later. It supports FAT12, FAT16, FAT32, exFAT, and NTFS file systems.

Jean-Pierre André, one of the developers of NTFS-3G, has created a fork of UltraDefrag 5 that runs on Linux. It only has a command-line interface.

Features
 Automatic defragmentation
 Defragmentation of individual files and folders
 Defragmentation of locked system files
 Defragmentation of NTFS metafiles (including MFT) and streams
 Exclusion of files by path, size and number of fragments
 Optimization of disks
 Disk processing time limit
 Defragmentation of disks having a certain fragmentation level
 Automatic hibernation or shutdown after the job completion
 Multilingual graphical interface (over 60 languages available)
 One click defragmentation via Windows Explorer's context menu
 Command line interface
 Portable edition
 Full support of 64-bit editions of Windows

See also
 Comparison of defragmentation software
 File system fragmentation

References

External links
 

Free defragmentation software
Free software programmed in C
Free software programmed in Lua (programming language)
Windows-only free software
Lua (programming language)-scripted software